Ong-Art Singlumpong is a Thai film director. Currently he is the executive director of  Channel 8.

Filmography
Dreamers (Fan Tid Fai Huajai Tid Din) (1997)
Friendship Breakdown (Taek 4 Rak Lop Krot Lew) (1999)
The Sin (Choo) (2004)

References

External links

Thai Film Director profile

1971 births
Ong-Art Singlumpong
Living people
Ong-Art Singlumpong
Ong-Art Singlumpong